Saimiriine gammaherpesvirus 2 (SaHV-2) is a species of virus in the genus Rhadinovirus, subfamily Gammaherpesvirinae, family Herpesviridae, and order Herpesvirales.

See also 
 HSUR (Herpesvirus saimiri U RNAs)
 Squirrel monkey (Saimiri)

References

External links
 

Gammaherpesvirinae